Ditrigona innotata is a moth in the family Drepanidae. It was described by George Hampson in 1892. It is found in China.

The wingspan is 18 mm for males and 17.5-19.5 mm for females. The forewings and hindwings are uniform white with a few scales.

References

Moths described in 1892
Drepaninae
Moths of Asia